Sparganium simplex can refer to:

Sparganium simplex Huds., a synonym of Sparganium emersum Rehmann
Sparganium simplex Muhl., a synonym of Sparganium angustifolium Michx.